William Jenkyn Thomas (5 July 1870 – 14 March 1959) was a Welsh headmaster and author best known for his The Welsh Fairy Book.  He was an undergraduate student at the University of Cambridge and in addition to his writings worked as a lecturer and teacher. He was the first Head Master at Aberdare Intermediate School (1896-1905) and was headmaster (1905-1935) at Hackney Downs School.

His father later lived in Cloddia, Llidiardau, Llanycil, on the outskirts of Bala, Merionethshire, and Jenkyn’s family are buried in the Methodist chapel there.

Selected publications 

Thomas, W. J. (1894). Penillion telyn, Rhan 1. Caernarfon: Gwymni y Cyhoeddwys Cymreig.

Thomas, W. J. (1870). Cambrensia: A literary reading book for Welsh schools. London: Edward Arnold.

Thomas, W. J. (1907). The Welsh fairy book. London: Fisher Unwin.

References 

1870 births
1959 deaths
Welsh writers